Christopher or Chris Caldwell may refer to:

Bob the Drag Queen (Christopher D. Caldwell, born 1986), American drag queen and winner of RuPaul's Drag Race
Christopher Caldwell (journalist) (born 1962), American writer
Christopher Caldwell (government official) (born 1963), American federal co-chairman of the Delta Regional Authority
Chris Caldwell (mathematician), American mathematician who maintains the website PrimePages